Sophia Hürlimann (born 30 March 2000) is a Liechtensteiner footballer who plays as a defender for Winterthur and the Liechtenstein national football team.

Career statistics

International

References

2000 births
Living people
Women's association football defenders
Liechtenstein women's international footballers
Liechtenstein women's footballers